SFC Stern 1900 is a German football club based in Berlin-Steglitz, currently playing in the Berlin-Liga (VI).

Stadium 
SFC Stern 1900 usually plays its home fixtures at the 1,000 capacity Sportplatz Schildhornstraße.

Honours 
The club's honours:
 Berliner Landespokal
 Runners-up: 2011

References

External links 
 SFC Stern 1900 

Football clubs in Germany
Football clubs in Berlin
Association football clubs established in 1900
SFC Stern 1900